Badamestan-e Mashhadiamir (also Romanized as Bādāmestān-e Mashhadīāmīr) is a village in Barez Rural District, Manj District, Lordegan County, Chaharmahal and Bakhtiari Province, Iran. At the 2006 census, its population was 31, in 5 families. The village is populated by Lurs.

References 

Populated places in Lordegan County
Luri settlements in Chaharmahal and Bakhtiari Province